Alexander Ridha (born 22 August 1982), better known by his stage name Boys Noize, is a German electronic music record producer, songwriter, and DJ. It is similar to the name of Ridha's label, Boysnoize Records, which he established in 2005. Ridha has remixed the work of a number of other artists, including Snoop Dogg and Depeche Mode. In 2019, he produced Frank Ocean's song "DHL".

Biography

Ridha started producing and DJing from an early age, including a period in which he supported Felix Da Housecat and DJ Hell under the alias of Kid Alex. He has been named one of the "Top 10 DJ's Who Rule The World" by Rolling Stone, elected "Best Electronic Act" by Beatport 3 years in a row, and was awarded the Independent Music Award in 2010. His music is known to merge various styles, with influences of hip-hop and disco roots as well as heavy noise and electro house sounds.

Ridha released his early work on labels such as International Deejay Gigolos Records, Kitsuné Music and Turbo Recordings. He established Boysnoize Records in 2005.

He remixed David Lynch, N.E.R.D, Depeche Mode, Snoop Dogg, Daft Punk, Justice, and the Chemical Brothers amongst many other well-known artists and became a producer of note, having worked with Kelis, UK rapper Kano, The Black Eyed Peas, and the South Korean band BIGBANG and has also collaborated with the New York band Scissor Sisters on their album "Only The Horses".

Chilly Gonzales' Ivory Tower is his first fully produced and co-written album, released in August 2010.

He has further collaborated with Erol Alkan: the first record "Death Suite" / "Waves" was released on Ridha's imprint BNR, followed by "Lemonade" / "Avalanche", which came out on Erol's label Phantasy Sound.

In October 2010, the first release of the newly launched sublabel BNR TRAX was presented.

In 2012, Boys Noize released his third studio album, Out of the Black.

In 2012, Boys Noize formed a side-project with Skrillex called Dog Blood which is in the electro genre. Dog Blood performed at the 2013 Miami Ultra Music Festival.

Boysnoize Records celebrated its 100th release in 2013, with electronic dance heavyweights The Chemical Brothers and Justice remixing Boys Noize's "XTC" and "ICH R U".

In 2014, Boys Noize did the music composition for a German movie named Who Am I – No System Is Safe. Ridha also collaborated with Chilly Gonzales to form Octave Minds. The self-titled debut album was released on BNR with track premieres on Pitchfork Dazed and Confused and Fader. Besides the album features a track called "Tap Dance", which features Chance the Rapper and the Social Experiment.

Boys Noize released his Go Hard EP in 2015, a  1 album release on Beatport.
In August 2015 it was announced that Ridha had collaborated with Jean-Michel Jarre on the track "The Time Machine" from the album Electronica 1: The Time Machine.

In 2016, Boys Noize released his fourth studio album, Mayday, which included collaborations with Benga, Remy Banks, Poliça, Hudson Mohawke, and Spank Rock. He described it as "[his] signal against blind categorization and conformist synchronization", "a call for individuality and diversity", and "a tribute to outsiders". It peaked at number 8 on Billboards Top Dance/Electronic Albums chart.

In 2020, Boys Noize started a Twitch channel where he later produced an album with the input from his followers. He even used Twitch to make a poll of which tracks he should release and what he should name the different tracks. He was the first in the world to do this.

Discography

Albums and EPs

Studio albums as lead artist

Remixed albums 
 Oi Oi Oi (Remixed), 2008

Mix albums 
 Bugged Out! Presents Suck My Deck (Mixed by Boys Noize) (2008)
 I Love Techno 2008 (Mixed by Boys Noize) (2008)
 Radio Soulwax Mix (2009)
 Mixmag Presents Electro Techno Thunder! (2009)
 South West Four Clapham Festival Preview (2010)
 FABRICLIVE 72: Boys Noize (2013)
 BNR10YR Bang Mix (Mixed by Boys Noize) (2013)

Extended plays

Collaborations

Singles

Singles as lead artist

Collaboration tracks

Remixes

References

External links

1982 births
German people of Iraqi descent
German electronic musicians
German house musicians
German DJs
Club DJs
Remixers
DJs from Hamburg
Musicians from Hamburg
Living people
Nu-disco musicians
Kitsuné artists
Electronic dance music DJs